Joseph Anthony Ceci  (born July 30, 1957)  is an Albertan politician who was elected in the 2019 Alberta general election to represent the electoral district of Calgary-Buffalo in the 30th Alberta Legislature. He was previously elected in 2015 to represent Calgary-Fort in the 29th Legislature. He is a member of the Alberta New Democratic Party. Prior to holding provincial office, Ceci served as an alderman on the Calgary City Council, representing Ward 9 from 1995 to 2010.

Background
Ceci was born in 1957 in Toronto, where he lived until 1976, following graduation from local high school Nelson A. Boylen Collegiate Institute.  He received a Bachelor of Social Work degree from the University of Western Ontario in 1980. Later that year, he moved to Calgary, where he worked as a social worker.  During this time, he attended the University of Calgary, where he received a master's degree in social work in 1989.

Calgary alderman 
He previously served on Calgary City Council as the alderman for Ward 9 from 1995 to 2010. In his 2004–2007 term he was a founding member community safety councils in Inglewood-Ramsay and Forest Lawn.

Ceci was challenged in the 2007 election by Al Koenig, president of the Calgary Police Association, who had criticized city council for not being "...as assertive on crime as we’d like to see"; Ceci defeated him by a wide margin.  He retired from City Council in 2010, choosing to not run for re-election after 15 years on the Council.

Provincial career 

Touted as a star candidate, Ceci ran for the Alberta New Democratic Party in the 2015 Alberta general election for the electoral district of Calgary-Fort, hoping to become the first NDP MLA elected in Calgary since 1993, when Bob Hawkesworth was defeated in the riding of Calgary Mountain View. He won the riding with a majority of over 3000 votes and 49.8% of the popular vote; Progressive Conservative candidate Andy Nguyen finished second in the popular vote. On May 24, 2015, he was sworn in as Minister of Finance and President of the Treasury Board in the Alberta Cabinet. Ceci was re-elected in the 2019 provincial election, however the NDP lost government and therefore Ceci lost his cabinet position.

Electoral history

2019 general election

2015 general election

References

External links
Official site of Joe Ceci

1957 births
Alberta New Democratic Party MLAs
Calgary city councillors
Living people
Members of the Executive Council of Alberta
Politicians from Toronto
21st-century Canadian politicians
Finance ministers of Alberta